Plagiobothrys parishii, known by the common name Parish's popcornflower,  is an uncommon species of flowering plant in the borage family.

Distribution
The plant is endemic to southeastern California. It is known only from 12 to 14 occurrences in the Owens Valley within Inyo County and Mono County, and 2 occurrences in the Lucerne Valley area of the Mojave Desert within San Bernardino County.

It is found in wetland-riparian  areas of Joshua tree woodland and Great Basin sagebrush scrub habitats.

Description
Plagiobothrys parishii is an annual herb growing prostrate along the ground, the stems reaching up to about 30 centimeters long. It is coated in short hairs.

The inflorescence is a series of tiny five-lobed flowers each about 4 millimeters wide. The flower is white, usually with yellow appendages at the center. The bloom period is March to June.

It is a listed Critically endangered species on the California Native Plant Society Inventory of Rare and Endangered Plants.  It is threatened by groundwater pumping.

References

External links
Calflora Database: Plagiobothrys parishii (Parish's popcornflower)
Jepson Manual eFlora (TJM2) treatment of Plagiobothrys parishii
UC CalPhotos gallery of Plagiobothrys parishii

parishii
Endemic flora of California
Flora of the California desert regions
Flora of the Great Basin
Natural history of the Mojave Desert
Natural history of Inyo County, California
Critically endangered flora of California